Xiong Dailin (熊黛林, born 10 October 1980), better known as Lynn Hung, is a Hong Kong-based fashion model and actress originally from mainland China.

Born in Nanjing, China, Hung moved her base of modeling activities to Hong Kong in 2006 and began working there mainly in the runway scene, becoming known as a top model, and beginning her acting career in 2008.

She became well known as the girlfriend of Aaron Kwok, a singer known as one of Hong Kong's "Four Heavenly Kings" from 2006 to 2013. 

Hong Kong press reported in 2009 that she was the #4 highest-paid model in Greater China, next to Hong Kong's Gaile Lai (#3), Mainland China's Jennifer Du (#2), and Taiwan's Lin Chi-ling (#1).

Early life
Hung was born in Nanjing, China with family roots in Guizhou on 10 October 1980. She later studied costume design and performing arts at Soochow University.

Career
In 1999, Hung developed her career in Shanghai and became the second runner-up in the "China National Model Competition". In 2002 she received the "Best Fashion Model" and the "China Top Ten Models" awards.

In 2008, Hung went to Hong Kong and started her acting career in the award-winning film Ip Man starring alongside Donnie Yen. She later appeared in films such as All's Well, Ends Well 2010, Ip Man 2, My Sassy Girl 2, and Ip Man 3.

She has also acted in Material Queen alongside Vanness Wu in 2011.

She has also been filming the show If You Love a Chinese season 2 with Korean actor and entertainer Lee Kwang-soo, who is best known as a cast member of the variety show Running Man.

Personal life
Hung had been in a serious relationship with Aaron Kwok since 2006. In 2012, when Aaron Kwok was planning his engagement to Lynn, her father Fan Tao was hospitalised for liver cancer, so it was postponed indefinitely. Fan later died in January 2013.

Hung dated Hong Kong businessman Ken Kwok in 2014 and they later married in December 2016.

Hung gave birth to twin daughters Kaylor and Lyvia in April 2018, in a private hospital located on Hong Kong Island, Hong Kong.

Filmography

Film

Television series

References

External links

Article on Jaynestars

1980 births
Living people
Hong Kong film actresses
Chinese female models
Hong Kong television actresses
Actresses from Jiangsu
Actresses from Nanjing
People with acquired residency of Hong Kong
Participants in Chinese reality television series
Chinese film actresses
Chinese television actresses
21st-century Chinese actresses
21st-century Hong Kong actresses